Ndudi Godwin Elumelu (born 23 February 1965) is a Nigerian politician representing Aniocha and Oshimili federal constituency in the House of Representatives, He is currently the Minority leader of the House of Representatives. and a younger brother to Tony Elumelu.

Background and early life 
Ndudi obtained his West African Secondary School Certificate from Lagos State school of art and science in 1986 and got his National Diploma in Business Administration from Yaba College of Technology in 1989. In 1993, he obtained a degree in accounting from Edo State University, Ekpoma, and master's degree in Business Administration from the same school in 2000.

Political career 
Ndudi was first elected into the House of Representatives in 2007 and was re-elected in 2011. During his first two terms, he was Chairman House Committee on Power from 2007 to 2010 and Chairman House Committee on Health from 2011 to 2015. In 2014, he contested for the governorship primaries of Delta State which he lost, thereby losing his seat at the house to Joan Onyemaechi Mrakpor. In 2019, he returned to the House of Representatives for a third term.

In 2021, Mr. Ndudi Elumelu launched an empowerment program with 456 recipients chosen from the Constituency. In 2022, he won the People's Democratic party house of representatives primaries.In February 2023, he lost the house of representatives election to the Labour Party candidate Ngozi Okolie.

References 

1965 births
People from Delta State
Peoples Democratic Party members of the House of Representatives (Nigeria)
Living people
Yaba College of Technology alumni